Mysophobia, also known as verminophobia, germophobia, germaphobia, bacillophobia and bacteriophobia, is a pathological fear of contamination and germs. The term was coined by William A. Hammond in 1879 when describing a case of obsessive–compulsive disorder (OCD) exhibited in repeatedly washing one's hands. Mysophobia has long been related to compulsive hand washing. Names pertaining directly to the abnormal fear of dirt and filth include molysmophobia or molysomophobia, rhypophobia, and rupophobia, whereas the terms bacillophobia and bacteriophobia specifically refer to the fear of bacteria and microbes in general.

The term mysophobia comes from the Greek μύσος (musos), "uncleanness" and φόβος (phobos), "fear".

Signs and symptoms 
People with mysophobia usually display signs including:

 excessive hand-washing 
 an avoidance of locations that might contain a high presence of germs
 a fear of physical contact, especially with strangers
 excessive effort dedicated to cleaning and sanitizing one's environment
 a refusal to share personal items 
 a fear of becoming ill

Mysophobia greatly affects the everyday life of individuals and can range in severity of symptoms from difficult breathing, excessive perspiration, increased heart rate, and states of panic when exposed to germ-enhanced conditions.

Cause
There are many underlying factors and reasons that a person may develop mysophobia, such as anxiety, depression, or a traumatic situation. Developing in a culture where hygiene is heavily integrated into society (use of hand sanitizers, toilet seat covers, and antibacterial wipes for commonly used items such as grocery carts), can also be a main driving force for the development of mysophobia.

Treatment
Treatment for mysophobia typically includes therapy, such as cognitive-behavioral therapy (CBT) or exposure therapy, which helps people gradually confront and overcome their fear. Self-help techniques, such as deep breathing, meditation and mindfulness, as well as education about germs and the importance of maintaining a healthy lifestyle, can also be helpful in managing mysophobia. It can be helpful for individuals to engage in activities that challenge their fear, such as touching public objects or shaking hands with others.

It's important to note that mysophobia is a treatable condition and seeking help from a mental health professional can greatly improve the quality of life for those who suffer from this phobia. With the right treatment and support, people with mysophobia can learn to manage their fear and regain control of their lives.

Society
Some well-known people who have (or had) mysophobia include Adolf Hitler, Howard Stern, Nikola Tesla, Howard Hughes, Howie Mandel, Saddam Hussein, and Donald Trump.

See also 
 List of phobias

References

External links
Mysophobia and the Ebola Virus

Ritual
Obsessive–compulsive disorder
Phobias